Abdulah Ali Abdulla Alaajel Al-Zaabi (born 1978) is an Emirati football referee who refereed in the 2012 AFF Suzuki Cup qualification.

Al-Zaabi became a FIFA referee in 2012.

References

External links 
 
 

1978 births
Living people
Emirati football referees